The Navy NCO SChool is a military institution for the training of non-commissioned officers of the Spanish Navy (cabo mayor (master corporal), sergeant , first sergeant , brigade (master sergeants), second lieutenant and subofficial mayor (warrant officer)). It is located in San Fernando in the Province of Cádiz, Andalusia, Spain. It was established during the reign of Carlos III between 1775 and 1789.

The San Fernando Naval Museum is within the school.

References

Military education and training in Spain
Buildings and structures in San Fernando, Cádiz
Schools in Spain
School buildings completed in 1789
1789 establishments in Spain
Spanish Navy